Anthrax seriepunctatus is a species of bee fly in the family Bombyliidae.

Distribution
Mexica, United States.

References

Bombyliidae
Insects described in 1886
Taxa named by Carl Robert Osten-Sacken
Diptera of North America